Avrilly is the name of several communes in France:

Avrilly, Allier, in the Allier département
Avrilly, Eure, in the Eure département 
Avrilly, Orne, in the Orne département